"Hey Man Nice Shot" is a song by American rock band Filter, released on April 25, 1995, as the lead single from their debut studio album Short Bus. Some radio stations were playing it as early as March. The guitar line in the chorus was previously used in the Stabbing Westward song "Ungod" in 1994. Stuart Zechman, who was also playing guitar for Stabbing Westward at the time, took the riff and showed it to Stabbing Westward who ended up using it as well.

Lyrics and music

The song was written about the public suicide of Pennsylvania state treasurer R. Budd Dwyer on January 22, 1987, in Harrisburg, Pennsylvania. Dwyer had been convicted of bribery charges in December 1986, and was expected to receive a long sentence from U.S. District Court Judge Malcolm Muir. Professing his innocence and decrying the legal system, Dwyer shot and killed himself with a .357 Magnum revolver during a press conference without injuring anyone else.

Although singer and songwriter Richard Patrick frequently clarified this in interviews, as well as the fact that he had first written the song in 1991 before the band even had a record deal, the song's popularity was augmented by a widespread perception that it was about the 1994 suicide of Kurt Cobain.

Musically, the verses of the song feature a "bed of ambient guitar" made with looped feedback as well as a distinctive palm-muted bass line, contrasting with the louder, guitar-heavy choruses and ending.

Music video
There are at least three versions of the music video for "Hey Man Nice Shot". The first version uses the album mix of the song; a second uses the promo-only remix later heard in The Cable Guy; and a third version uses the "Sober Mix". All three of these versions feature footage with color effects being added in during the post-production of the video.

Track listing 
Hey Man Nice Shot (U.S. promotional 12-inch vinyl)
 Hey Man Nice Shot (1/4 Pound) (5:00)
 Hey Man Nice Shot (1/4 Pound Instrumental) (4:59)
 Hey Man Nice Shot (Nickel Bag) (3:42)
 Hey Man Nice Shot (Big Mac) (8:41)
 Hey Man Nice Shot (Big Mac Instrumental) (8:43)

Hey Man Nice Shot (German Maxi-Single)
 Hey Man Nice Shot (Bud Gets The Lead Out) (5:14)
 Hey Man Nice Shot (Sawed Off Edit) (5:20)
 Hey Man Nice Shot (Nickel Bag) (3:43)
 White Like That (Dictaphone Version) (2:12)

Hey Man Nice Shot (US Maxi-Single)
 Sober mix (5:14)
 Nickel Bag mix (3:43)
 1/4 Pound mix (5:00)
 Big Mac mix (8:41)
 White Like That (Dictaphone Version) (2:12)

Chart positions

References

1995 debut singles
1995 songs
R. Budd Dwyer
Filter (band) songs
Reprise Records singles
Songs about death
Songs about suicide
Songs based on American history
Songs written by Richard Patrick
Music videos directed by Kevin Kerslake
Post-grunge songs